Mark Pauline (born December 14, 1953) is an American performance artist and inventor,  best known as founder and director of Survival Research Laboratories. He is a 1977 graduate of Eckerd College in St. Petersburg, Florida.

Pauline founded SRL in 1978 and it is considered the premier practitioner of "industrial performing arts", and the forerunner of large scale machine performance.  SRL is known for producing the most dangerous shows on earth.  Although acknowledged as a major influence on popular competitions pitting remote-controlled robots and machines against each other, such as BattleBots and Robot Wars, Pauline shies away from rules-bound competition preferring a more anarchic approach.  Machines are liberated and re-configured away from the functions they were originally meant to perform.  

Pauline has written of SRL, "Since its inception SRL has operated as an organization of creative technicians dedicated to re-directing the techniques, tools, and tenets of industry, science, and the military away from their typical manifestations in practicality, product or warfare."  Since its beginning through the end of 2006, SRL has conducted about 48 shows.  

In the summer of 1982, Pauline severely damaged his right hand while experimenting with solid rocket fuel.  In August 1990, ArtPark, a state-sponsored arts festival in Lewiston, New York, cancelled a Pauline performance when it turned out he intended "to cover a sputtering Rube Goldberg spaceship with numerous Bibles" that would "serve as thermal protective shields" and be burned to ashes in the course of the performance.

According to Pauline "I like to make machines that can just do their own shows... machines that can do all that machines in the science fiction novels can do. I want to be there to make those dreams real."

References

External links
 Survival Research Labs
 Appearance on KRON-TV's "SFO with Steve Jamison" variety show in 1981 (San Francisco, Calif.)
 National Public Radio report on SRL, with link to radio broadcast
 comprehensive July 1996 Wired magazine article on Pauline and SRL by Bruce Sterling

1953 births
Living people
20th-century American inventors
American performance artists
Artists from the San Francisco Bay Area
Culture of San Francisco
American roboticists
Robotic art
San Francisco Art Institute alumni
Sarasota High School alumni
Eckerd College alumni